Jack James may refer to:
Jack James (Australian footballer) (1892–1977), Australian rules footballer for St Kilda and Richmond in the Victorian Football League
Jack James (footballer, born 2000), defender for Luton Town
Jack James (rocket engineer) (1920–2001), worked on NASA's Mariner program

See also
John James (disambiguation)